The Savages is the completely missing ninth serial of the third season in the British science fiction television series Doctor Who, which was first broadcast in four weekly parts from 28 May to 18 June 1966.

In this serial, the Doctor (William Hartnell) and his travelling companions Steven (Peter Purves) and Dodo (Jackie Lane) arrive on an unnamed planet where they encounter two distinct people - the Elders and the Savages. They soon discover the Elders are the evil ones, draining the primitive Savages for their life source to remain young and powerful forever. This serial marks the final appearance of Purves as Steven.

To date, the serial is missing from the BBC archives. Although audio recordings, still photographs, and 8mm clips of the story exist, no episodes of this serial are known to have survived.

Plot
The TARDIS materialises on a distant planet in the far future. The First Doctor, Steven and Dodo find the planet inhabited by both an advanced, idyllic civilisation (the Elders), and bands of roaming savages. The Elders welcome the Doctor, greeting him as "The Traveller from Beyond Time" and revealing they have admired his exploits from afar and predicted that he would soon be arriving here. Their leader Jano showers the Doctor and his companions with compliments and gifts, reinforcing the idyllic nature of the society of the Elders. However, the Doctor becomes suspicious of the Elders' seemingly perfect civilisation, but it is Dodo who finds the secret. The soldiers Exorse and Edal are sent outside the Elder city and use advanced weapons to capture the savages, entrapping them and returning them to the city. The Elders are only able to maintain the energy needed to run their civilisation by draining the life force of the helpless savages. The Doctor, appalled, tries to stop the Elders and persuade them of the wrong they are doing by building a civilisation on such immoral grounds.

Jano's response is to have the Doctor himself subjected to the energy transfer process. The Doctor is put into the transfer device and his life force is channelled into the Elder Jano, who desires his intelligence. Yet the plan backfires when the Doctor's personality takes over Jano, imbuing him with the Doctor's mannerisms, outlook and morality. The two identities cause Jano a personality crisis.
Dodo and Steven have meanwhile ventured outside the city and made contact with the savage leaders Chal and Tor, who are respectively pleased and antagonised by their presence. The savages are the remnants of a once highly skilled and artistic race, but over the centuries the energy transfer process has stymied their creativity and ability. Chal hides the two fugitives in a deep cave system, pursued by the guard Exorse, whom Steven overpowers. They return to the city and find a weak but determined Doctor, and help him escape the city.

The time travellers now help the Savages fight back against the Elder guards. The Doctor realises that the Elders must be forced, not persuaded, to change their ways as their whole civilisation must change overnight. His mixed personality convinces Jano to help the Savages and he tries to convince the other Elders to treat the Savages as equals, while Exorse too has realised the error of his ways. Jano and Exorse begin the destruction of the technology underpinning the society and are soon joined in the destruction by the Doctor, Steven and Dodo. The end of the technology means the end of the oppression, and Jano and Chal begin to talk of how a new society can be built together. The Doctor surprises Steven by convincing him to remain behind as a mediator. When both sides agree to accept Steven's decision, he decides to stay. The Doctor and a heartbroken Dodo bid their friend goodbye, before they head back to the TARDIS.

Production
Working titles for this story included The White Savages. This was the first serial of the series to have an overall title divided into numbered parts or episodes. All stories up until and including The Gunfighters had individual episode titles for each episode.

Cast notes

This was Purves' last appearance as companion Steven Taylor. He later said that "I was unhappy to leave it, actually, I didn’t particularly want it to stop there, but the policy of the programme had changed and they’d decided that they were not going to keep the companions onboard for longer than a year, or so I understand."

Clare Jenkins later played Tanya Lernov in The Wheel in Space (1968) and The War Games (1969). Frederick Jaeger later played Sorenson in Planet of Evil (1975) and Professor Marius in The Invisible Enemy (1977). Ewen Solon appeared as Vishinsky in Planet of Evil. Patrick Godfrey later played Major Cosworth in The Mind of Evil (1971). Robert Sidaway later played Captain Turner in The Invasion (1968). Kay Patrick previously appeared as Poppaea in The Romans (1965).

Broadcast and reception

In the guidebook The Discontinuity Guide, it was described as a serial that "plays intelligent games with witless SF clichés. Whilst not aspiring to greatness it does create an effective atmosphere."

Commercial releases

In print

A novelisation of this serial, written by Ian Stuart Black, was published by Target Books in March 1986.

Home media
The complete soundtrack recordings, as recorded off-air by fans and coupled with linking narration by Peter Purves, has been released on CD. All four episodes of this serial are missing from the BBC archive. A few brief off-air 8 mm film recordings made by an unknown Australian fan represent the only extant clips (which include the departure of Steven) and were made available on the DVD box set release Lost in Time. A reconstruction has been made with telesnaps, production stills and the complete soundtrack.

References

External links

First Doctor serials
Doctor Who missing episodes
Doctor Who serials novelised by Ian Stuart Black
1966 British television episodes